This is a list of all named craters on minor planets in the Solar System as named by IAU's Working Group for Planetary System Nomenclature. In addition tentatively named craters—such as those of Pluto—may also be referred to. The number of craters is given in parenthesis. For a full list of all craters, see list of craters in the Solar System.

Images

Ceres (90) 

back to top

Eros (37) 

back to top

Gaspra (31) 

back to top

Ida (21) 

back to top

Itokawa (10) 

back to top

Lutetia (19) 

back to top

Mathilde (23)

Pluto (17) 

back to top

Šteins (23) 

back to top

Vesta (90) 

back to top